Kisvárdai KC is a Hungarian handball club from Kisvárda. Since the season 2017/18 it plays in the Nemzeti Bajnokság I.

Kits

Team

Current squad
Squad for the 2022–23 season

 Head coach: Valéria Szabó
 Assistant coach: 
 Goalkeeping coach: Levente Nagy
 Fittness coach: Ferenc Martinovics
 Doctor: Jenő Kósa, MD
 Chairman: Tamás Major
 Technical manager: Flóra Csendes-Major

Goalkeepers
 44  Boglárka Leskóczi
 88  Dalma Mátéfi 
 91  Kristina Graovac
Left wingers
 13  Maja Mérai 
 31  Aleksandra Stamenić
 Right wingers
 7  Laura Udvardi 
 32  Natsumi Akiyama
 18  Zea Kadlicsek
Line players
 13  Nikoleta Trúnková
 62  Gréta Sápi
 9  Kitti Makkai

Back players
LB
 21  Simona Szarková
 24  Pálma Siska
 52  Gréta Juhász
 28  Katalin Erőss
CB
 20  Tamara Radojević
 25  Fruzsina Bouti
RB
 14  Veronika Habánková
 77  Szabina Karnik

Transfers
Transfers for the 2023–24 season

 Joining

 Leaving
  Laura Udvardi (RW) (to  Mosonmagyaróvár KC)
  Fruzsina Bouti (PM) (to  Dunaújvárosi Kohász KA)
  Veronika Habánková (RB) (to  IUVENTA Michalovce)

Notable former players

 Adrienn Orbán
 Krisztina Triscsuk
 Ágnes Triffa
 Ivett Nagy
 Bettina Pásztor
 Valéria Szabó
 Marina Dmitrović
 Kristina Liščević
 Ana Tomkovic
 Ekaterina Dzhukeva
 Maria Khakunova
 Yelena Avdekova
 Alena Ikhneva
 Darina Shulega
 Weronika Kordowiecka
 Andrea Klikovac
 Ana Maria Dragut
 Aneta Benko
 Lea Vukojevic
 Tamires Morena
 Samira Rocha
 Isabel Guialo
 Hanna Yttereng
 Olena Umanets
 Viktoria Tsybulenko
 Ivanna Myhovych
 Marija Gedroit
 Yuliya Kucerová
 Marianna Rebičová

Coaches 

  Tibor Zupkó (between 1992–1993)
 György Simák (between 1992–1993)
 Mária Berzsenyi (1993–1995)
 Tibor Oláh (between 1995–1996)
 Balázs Benyáts (between 1995–1996)
 János Babán (1996–1997)
 János Palkó (1997–1999)
 Béla Kerezsi (1999)
 Péter Kovács (2016)
  Eszter Mátéfi (2016–2018)
  János Dévényi (2018, 2019)
  Vlatko Đonović (2018–2019)
  Botond Bakó (2019–2023)
  Valéria Bányász-Szabó (2023–)

References

External links
 Official website

Hungarian handball clubs
Sports clubs in Kisvárda